The N10 or National Highway 10 is a national highway in Ghana that begins at Kumasi and runs north to Burkina Faso, where it turns into the N5 of Burkina Faso. This makes it to one of the most important economical connections to Burkina Faso. At Tamale the N10 intersects with N9. At Bolgatanga the N10 intersects with N11. The N10 spans a distance of 578 kilometers.

Route
Major towns and cities along the route of the N10 include Kumasi, Techiman, Tamale, Bolgatanga, Navrongo and Paga.

See also 
Ghana Road Network

References

Roads in Ghana